Chandra Parbat II (Hindi:चन्द्रा पर्वत II) is a mountain of the Garhwal Himalaya in Uttarakhand, India. It is 44th highest located entirely within the Uttrakhand. Nanda Devi, is the highest mountain in this category. Chandra Parbat II lies between the Suralaya and Sweta Glaciers. It lies on the eastern bank of the Suralaya Glacier. It is located 1.6 km NW of Chandra parbat I  and 6.8 km west lies Vasuki Parbat . On the 8.3 km  SWS  lies the Swachhand Peak  and Bhgirathi Massif  on the west side.

Climbing History
In 1938, a six-member Austrian team led by Prof. R. Schwarzgruber, had made the first ascent of Chandra Parbat I. Frauenberger and Spannraft reached the top on 11 September 1938 following the west ridge.

An Indian Air Force team led by Pilot Officer Raju climbed Chandra Parbat I in 1965.

An Indian team of the Indo-Tibetan Border Police reached the summit on 29 September 1974.

Glaciers and rivers

It is surrounded by glaciers on both the sides Suralaya Glacier on the western side, sweta Bamak on the eastern side, Both the glacier joins with Chaturangi Glacier and Chaturangi Glacier joins with Gangotri Glacier from there emerges the river Bhagirathi the main tributaries of river Ganga.

Neighboring peaks

Neighboring peaks of Chandra Parbat II:
 Chandra Parbat I::  
 Mana Parbat I:  
 Mana Parbat II: 
 Kalindi peak: 
 Pilapani Parbat: 
 Satopanth:

See also

 List of Himalayan peaks of Uttarakhand

References

Mountains of Uttarakhand
Six-thousanders of the Himalayas
Geography of Chamoli district